1998 J.League Cup Final was the 6th final of the J.League Cup competition. The final was played at National Stadium in Tokyo on July19, 1998. Júbilo Iwata won the championship.

Match details

See also
1998 J.League Cup

References

J.League Cup
1998 in Japanese football
Júbilo Iwata matches
JEF United Chiba matches